Sandra Góngora (born 6 October 1985) is a Mexican ten-pin bowler.

Góngora competed at the Pan American Games in 2007 where she won a bronze medal in the doubles event alongside Adriana Pérez, in 2011 where she won a silver medal in the doubles event alongside Miriam Zetter, and in 2015.

She attended Wichita State University, where she was named National Collegiate Bowling Coaches Association (NCBCA) MVP and first-team All-American in 2008–09.

References

1985 births
Living people
Mexican ten-pin bowling players
Mexican sportswomen
Pan American Games medalists in bowling
Pan American Games silver medalists for Mexico
Pan American Games bronze medalists for Mexico
Bowlers at the 2007 Pan American Games
Bowlers at the 2011 Pan American Games
Bowlers at the 2015 Pan American Games
Wichita State Shockers athletes
Sportspeople from Monterrey
Competitors at the 2009 World Games
Competitors at the 2013 World Games
Competitors at the 2017 World Games
World Games bronze medalists
World Games medalists in bowling
Medalists at the 2007 Pan American Games
Medalists at the 2011 Pan American Games
20th-century Mexican women
21st-century Mexican women